Henri Parol Gottrand (15 July 1901 – 22 August 1984) was a French racing cyclist. He rode in the 1927 Tour de France.

References

1901 births
1984 deaths
French male cyclists
Place of birth missing